Special Investigations Bureau or Special Investigation Bureau may refer to:

 Bureau of Special Investigation of Myanmar
 Puerto Rico Special Investigations Bureau
 Wichita Police Department's Special Investigations Bureau

See also

 SIB (disambiguation)
 Special Investigations Unit (disambiguation)
 Special Investigations Division (disambiguation)
 Office of Special Investigations (disambiguation)
 Special Investigations Section (disambiguation)
 Special Investigations (disambiguation)